Çınarcık can refer to:

 Çınarcık
 Çınarcık, Orhaneli
 Çınarcık, Yenice